St. John's Regional Seminary (Philosophate) founded in 1987 is a propaedeutic seminary equipping students with philosophical training.  It is located in the rural town of Kothavalasa in the Vizianagaram District in Andhra Pradesh, India.

Affiliation
The seminary is not affiliated to any university.  However, the Seminary is listed as a propaedeutic seminary under the Roman Curia.

The seminary used to offer a two-year course in philosophy.  but, from 1999, it began offering a three-year course in philosophy to enable its students to simultaneously pursue the secular graduate degrees of Bachelor of Arts (B. A.) and Master of Arts (M. A.) through the School of Distance Education, Andhra University, Visakhapatnam.

Background
St. John's Regional Seminary was founded in 1965 in Ramanthapur, Hyderabad to train Priests for the Catholic Church in Andhra Pradesh.  Later in 1987, the seminary was split into two. The theologiate was retained in Hyderabad while the philosophate was moved to Kothavalasa in the northern circars of Andhra Pradesh.

Authorities and officials
According to an agreement signed between the Andhra Pradesh Bishop’s Council and the Salesian Province of St. Joseph, Hyderabad, on 24 May 1993 the management of the seminary has been entrusted to the Salesians of Don Bosco for a period of ten years. The contract was in 2003 for a period of six years. It was renewed again in 2009 for ten more years. The Seminary is overseen by the following Salesians:

 Provincial - Rev. Fr. Raminedi Balaraju, SDB
 Rector - Fr. Koonananickal Jose, SDB
 Dean - Br. Vincent Castilino, SDB
 Principal - Fr. Mathiekal Wilson, SDB
 Administrator - Fr. Cherapanath Rinoy, SDB

Admissions
The seminary follows a semester system. Admission is for Catholic pupils who are eligible to pursue priestly studies and who come from any of the ten Catholic dioceses and two archdioceses in Andhra Pradesh as well as any religious Congregation willing to send their students for Priestly formation.

Staff

Faculty
 Theology and Spirituality, English
 Fr. K. Jose
 Fr. S. Devadas
 Systematic Philosophy
 Fr. M. Wilson
 Fr. C. Rinoy
 Br. V. Castilino

Visiting Faculty
 Sr. Philomena D'Souza, FMA
 Fr. G. Lazar, SVD
 Fr. Mark K. Raj, SJ
 Fr. C. P. Varghese, SDB
 Fr. Francis Stephen, MSFS
 Fr. P. Antony
 Fr. P. Johnson, OFM Cap.
 Fr. Francis Stephen, MSFS

Other staff
 Assistant Librarian and Clerk
 Sri Ch. Sai Ram
 Computers
 Sri R. Joseph

Past faculty
 Bishop G. Prasad

See also
Other university-affiliated seminaries in Andhra region
 Master's College of Theology, Visakhapatnam
 Bethel Bible College, Guntur

Theological degrees:
 Doctor of Divinity (D.Div.), Doctor of Theology (Th.D.), Master of Theology (Th.M.), Bachelor of Divinity (B.Div.), Bachelor of Theology (Th.B.), Licentiate in Theology, Licentiate in Sacred Scripture

Members of the Andhra Pradesh Federation of Churches
 Archbishop M. Joji
 Bishop G. Prasad
 Bishop D. M. Prakasam
 Bishop G. Dyvasirvadam
 Bishop V. E. Christopher
 Bishop B. P. Sugandhar

Indigenous scholars
 B. V. Subbamma
 Y. D. Tiwari
 D. S. Amalorpavadass a.k.a. Swamy Amalorananda

References

Catholic seminaries
Catholic universities and colleges in India
Christian seminaries and theological colleges in India
Universities and colleges in Vizianagaram district
Educational institutions established in 1987
1987 establishments in Andhra Pradesh
Uttarandhra